Venstresocialisternes Ungdom (Youth of the Left Socialists) was the youth wing of the Danish political party Venstresocialisterne (Left Socialists). VSU was founded at a conference February 4–5, 1984.

VSU was dissolved in 1992. Members of VSU were active in the establishment of the new youth organization REBEL the very same year.

External links
 Article on VSU

Youth wings of political parties in Denmark
Socialism in Denmark